Dargun is a rural locality (a village) in Yugskoye Rural Settlement, Cherepovetsky District, Vologda Oblast, Russia. The population was 14 as of 2002.

Geography 
Popovskoye is the nearest rural locality.

References 

Rural localities in Cherepovetsky District